St. Benedict is a village in the Canadian province of Saskatchewan within the Rural Municipality of Three Lakes No. 400 and Census Division No. 15.

The village was founded by German immigrants in the first decades of the 20th century. 

The Roman Catholic church in St. Benedict contains works by the artist Berthold Imhoff.

History 
St. Benedict incorporated as a village on January 1, 1964.

Demographics 

External links
 Map of St. Benedict at Statcan

References

Villages in Saskatchewan
Three Lakes No. 400, Saskatchewan
Division No. 15, Saskatchewan